Dietmar Saupe (born 1954) is a fractal researcher and professor of computer science, Department of Computer and Information Science, University of Konstanz, Germany.

Saupe's book, Chaos and Fractals, won the Association of American Publishers award for Best Mathematics Book of the Year in 1992. His current research interests include computer graphics, scientific visualization, and image processing.

External links
 University of Konstanz bio

German computer scientists
1954 births
Living people
Date of birth missing (living people)